was a Japanese figure skater and a coach.

He was raised in Osaka, Japan.

Oimatsu won the Japan Figure Skating Championships from 1931. He represented Japan at the 1932 Winter Olympics and 1936 Winter Olympics, World Figure Skating Championships from 1932 and 1936.

After World War II, he retired from competitive skating and became a coach. In 1952, he was invited to Osaka Sports Center Ice Skating Rink.

Competitive highlights

References

External links
  
 

1911 births
2001 deaths
Japanese male single skaters
Olympic figure skaters of Japan
Figure skaters at the 1932 Winter Olympics
Figure skaters at the 1936 Winter Olympics